George Hughes Revercomb (June 3, 1929 – August 1, 1993) was a United States district judge of the United States District Court for the District of Columbia.

Education and career

Born in Charleston, West Virginia, Revercomb received an Artium Baccalaureus degree from Princeton University in 1950. He was in the United States Air Force from 1951 to 1953, and received a Juris Doctor from the University of Virginia School of Law in 1955. Revercomb was a legal assistant for the Federal Communications Commission in Washington, D.C. from 1958 to 1959. He was in private practice in Norfolk, Virginia from 1961 to 1962. He was in private practice in Roanoke, Virginia from 1955 to 1956, then in Charleston, West Virginia from 1956 to 1961, and in Washington, D.C. from 1962 to 1969. Revercomb was an associate deputy United States Attorney General of the United States Department of Justice from 1969 to 1970. He was an Associate Judge of the Superior Court of the District of Columbia from 1970 to 1985. He received a Master of Laws from the University of Virginia School of Law in 1982, at age 53.

Federal judicial service

On November 7, 1985, Revercomb was nominated by President Ronald Reagan to a seat on the United States District Court for the District of Columbia vacated by Judge Thomas Aquinas Flannery. Revercomb was confirmed by the United States Senate on December 16, 1985, and received his commission on December 17, 1985. Revercomb served in that capacity until his death of cancer, in Washington, D.C., on August 1, 1993, at the age of 64.

References

Sources
 

1929 births
1993 deaths
American Presbyterians
Judges of the United States District Court for the District of Columbia
Princeton University alumni
Superior court judges in the United States
United States Air Force officers
United States district court judges appointed by Ronald Reagan
20th-century American judges
University of Virginia School of Law alumni
20th-century American lawyers
Judges of the Superior Court of the District of Columbia